This list of breeds of domestic donkey is based on country reports to the international DAD-IS database.

Breeds

References

D